Carum foetidum is a species of flowering plant in the family Apiaceae. It is found in Algeria and Spain. Its natural habitats are rivers and saline marshes. It is threatened by habitat loss.

References

foetidum
Flora of Algeria
Flora of Spain
Near threatened plants
Near threatened flora of Africa
Near threatened biota of Europe
Taxonomy articles created by Polbot